The 1972–73 DDR-Oberliga season was the 25th season of the DDR-Oberliga, the top level of ice hockey in East Germany. Two teams participated in the league, and SG Dynamo Weißwasser won the championship.

Game results 

Dynamo Weißwasser wins series 10:6 in points.

References

External links 
 East German results 1970–1990

DDR-Oberliga (ice hockey) seasons
Ober
Ger
1972 in East German sport
1973 in East German sport